A Thief Has Arrived may refer to:

 A Thief Has Arrived (1940 film), a 1940 Argentine film
 A Thief Has Arrived (1950 film), a 1950 Spanish film